Omiodes surrectalis is a moth in the family Crambidae. Described by Francis Walker in 1866, it is found in the Democratic Republic of the Congo, India, Indonesia (Java, Sulawesi), the Philippines, Sri Lanka, New Guinea and Queensland, Australia.

References

Moths described in 1866
surrectalis